Tadeusz Paweł Zakrzewski (11 August 1883 in Skoki – 26 November 1961) was a Polish Catholic priest, auxiliary bishop of Łomża (1938–1946), bishop of Płock (1946–1961), rector of Polish Papal Institute in Rome (1928–1938).

Buried at Masovian Blessed Virgin Mary Cathedral in Płock.

1883 births
1961 deaths
Bishops of Łomża
Bishops of Płock
Burials at Płock Cathedral
20th-century Roman Catholic bishops in Poland